Dakota Galen Cochrane (born May 1, 1986) is an American mixed martial artist who fights in the Lightweight and Welterweight divisions. He has competed for Bellator MMA, Resurrection Fighting Alliance, Legacy Fighting Championship, Titan Fighting Championships, and Legacy Fighting Alliance. Cochrane is currently competing as a bare-knuckle boxer in the Bare Knuckle Fighting Championship (BKFC). He has a victory over former UFC Champion Johny Hendricks.

Background
Cochrane attended University of Nebraska at Kearney, where he was an all-league pole vaulter and relay runner.

Mixed martial arts career

Early career

Cochrane competed seven times as an amateur, going undefeated. He made his pro debut in November 2009.

Cochrane began his professional career in late 2009, amassing a 4–0 start before his first loss to future UFC fighter TJ O'Brien in July 2010. O'Brien used his grappling to defeat Cochrane by rear naked choke early in the first round.

Cochrane bounced back from the loss bringing his record to 11–1 including a late replacement bout against former WEC champion Jamie Varner at Titan Fighting Championships 20 on September 23, 2011. The fight was taken on four days' notice and was fought at a catch-weight of 165 lb. Cochrane dominated the fight—both standing and on the ground—in a hard-fought unanimous-decision win.

The Ultimate Fighter

Cochrane appeared in the first episode of The Ultimate Fighter: Live facing James Vick. He lost to Vick via split decision.

Resurrection Fighting Alliance

Cochrane then fought former NCAA wrestling standout Ramico Blackmon at RFA 1 on December 16, 2011 in Kearney, Nebraska. Cochrane lost the fight by a 3-round unanimous decision in which Blackmon used his superior wrestling to neutralize Cochrane's stand up attack.

Cochrane lost for the second straight time in the RFA when he was submitted in the first round by Cliff Wright at RFA 2 on March 30, 2012. Cochrane took down Wright early in the round, but Wright was able to reverse the position, get Cochrane's back, and subsequently choke Cochrane unconscious with a rear naked choke.

Cochrane next defeated former UFC lightweight title contender Joe Stevenson in the main event of RFA 3 on June 30, 2012. After outstriking and outgrappling an out of shape Stevenson, Cochrane was able to sink in a rear naked choke to force the tap 64 seconds into the second round.

Cochrane won his second straight RFA fight at RFA 4 with a dominant victory over Derrick Burnsed. After escaping several submission attempts from Burnsed early on, Cochrane was able to latch on to a fight-ending armbar late in the first round.

Cochrane defeated Deivison Francisco Ribeiro via TKO due to elbows in the third round at RFA 6, Cochrane dominated the fight before finishing Ribeiro.

Cochrane stepped inside the cage again at RFA 17 against Christos Giagos for RFA's inaugural lightweight title on August 22 at the Sanford Pentagon, which was South Dakota's first-ever sanctioned MMA event. He lost the fight by KO due to a flying knee in round 2. This marked the first time Dakota had been knocked out in his career.

Bellator MMA
Cochrane stepped in for an injured Derek Campos to face Alexander Sarnavskiy at Bellator 128 on October 10, 2014. He lost the fight via rear naked choke submission in the first round.

Cochrane faced Ryan Couture at Bellator 135 on March 27, 2015. He lost the fight via rear naked choke submission in the first round and was subsequently released from the promotion.

Bare knuckle boxing

World Bare Knuckle Fighting Federation
Cochrane replaced Brennan Ward at World Bare Knuckle Fighting Federation's inaugural event on November 9, 2018. He defeated Johny Hendricks by technical knockout in the second round.

Bare Knuckle Fighting Championship
Cochrane's next bare-knuckle boxing match was against Chris Leben at Bare Knuckle Fighting Championship 6: Malignaggi vs. Lobov on June 22, 2019. Cochrane won the match by unanimous decision.

Cochrane was booked to face Tyler Vogel at BKFC 15: Shewmaker vs. O'Bannon on December 11, 2020. He won by fifth-round TKO.

Acting in gay pornographic films

Dakota Cochrane has participated in gay pornography, appearing on the gay porn website Sean Cody. He is credited in several videos, engaging in oral, anal, and group sex under the stage name of "Danny".  Cochrane's credits include Danny & Cole (2007), Parker, Billy & Danny (2007), Danny & Billy (2007), Fuckfest 6 (2007), Hugo & Danny Flip Flop (2007), Danny Gets Fucked! (2007), Nicolas & Danny (2007), Danny's Toys (2007), Gage Gets Fucked (2007), Danny & Ford (2007), Danny & Terry (2007).   Cochrane disclosed his participation in porn to the UFC in his audition tape for The Ultimate Fighter 15. Despite his former career in gay porn Cochrane adamantly claims that he is heterosexual. Cochrane stopped participating in gay porn after admitting to his girlfriend at the time what he was doing and she requested that he stop.

Personal life
Dakota and his wife Lacey have three children.

Championships and accomplishments

Dynasty Combat Sports
DCS Welterweight Championship (One time, current) 

M-1 Global
M-1 Global USA National Welterweight Championship (One time) 

Victory Fighting Championship
VFC Welterweight Championship (One time) 

Total Warrior Combat
TWC Welterweight Championship (One time)

The Cage Inc.
TCI Lightweight Championship (One time)

Mixed martial arts record

|-
|Win
|align=center|34–13
|Justin Baesman
|Submission (arm-triangle choke) 
|DCS 77: New Years Knockout 2022
|
|align=center|2
|align=center|3:52
|Omaha, Nebraska, United States
|
|-
|Win
|align=center|33–13
|James Warfield
|Submission (guillotine choke)
|M-1 Global: Road to M-1 USA 2
|
|align=center|1
|align=center|1:19
|Winterhaven, California, United States
|
|-
|Loss
|align=center|32–13
|Scott Futrell
|Submission (rear naked choke)
|DCS 45: Ballyard Brawl Night 2
|
|align=center|2
|align=center|2:19
|Lincoln, Nebraska, United States
| 
|-
|Win
|align=center|32–12
|Julian Lane
|Submission (rear naked choke)
|DCS 42: Rumble At The Ralston
|
|align=center|1
|align=center|2:35
|Ralston, Nebraska, United States
|
|-
|Win
|align=center|31–12
|Drew Lipton
|Submission (guillotine choke)
|DCS 38: Seasons Beatings 2017
|
|align=center|1
|align=center|0:21
|Lincoln, Nebraska, United States
|
|-
|Win
|align=center|30–12
|Ciro Rodrigues
|Decision (split)
|LFA 25
|
|align=center|3
|align=center|5:00
|Ralston, Nebraska, United States
|
|-
|Win
|align=center|29–12
|Maki Pitolo
|Submission (guillotine choke)
|Victory FC 58
|
|align=center|2
|align=center|4:58
|Omaha, Nebraska, United States
|
|-
|Win
|align=center|28–12
|David Castillo
|Decision (unanimous)
|Victory FC Fight Night Harrah's 5
|
|align=center|3
|align=center|5:00
|Council Bluffs, Iowa, United States
|
|-
|Loss
|align=center|27–12
|Jordan Larson
|DQ (illegal knee)
|Legacy Fighting Alliance Fight Night 1
|
|align=center|2
|align=center|1:15
|Sioux Falls, South Dakota, United States
|
|-
|Loss
|align=center|27–11
|E.J. Brooks
|Decision (unanimous)
|Victory FC 56
|
|align=center|3
|align=center|5:00
|Omaha, Nebraska, United States
|
|-
|Win
|align=center|27–10
|Jake Lindsey
|Submission (guillotine choke)
|Victory FC 55
|
|align=center|1
|align=center|0:53
|Topeka, Kansas, United States
|
|-
|Win
|align=center|26–10
|Jos Eichelberger
|Submission (rear naked choke)
|Legacy Fighting Championship 60
|
|align=center|2
|align=center|4:47
|Hinckley, Minnesota, United States
|
|-
|Win
|align=center|25–10
|Jason Witt
|Submission (rear naked choke)
|Victory FC 52
|
|align=center|2
|align=center|3:17
|Omaha, Nebraska, United States
|
|-
|Win
|align=center|24–10
|Dequan Townsend
|Decision (split)
|TWC 29: Jaynes vs. Lamson
|
|align=center|5
|align=center|5:00
|Lansing, Michigan, United States
|
|-
| Loss
|align=center|23–10
|Valdir Araujo
|TKO (punches)
|Victory FC 49
|
|align=center|2
|align=center|4:21
|Omaha, Nebraska, United States
|
|-
|Win
|align=center|23–9
||Jake Lindsey
|Submission (guillotine choke)
|Victory FC 47
|
|align=center|3
|align=center|3:43
|Omaha, Nebraska, United States
|
|-
|Win
|align=center|22–9
|Raymond Gray
|TKO (punches)
|Dynasty Combat Sports 22: Seasons Beatings 2015
|
|align=center|1
|align=center|3:11
|Lincoln, Nebraska, United States
|
|-
|Win
|align=center|21–9
|Ben Neumann
|Decision (unanimous)
|RFA 32: Blumer vs. Higo
|
|align=center|3
|align=center|5:00
|Prior Lake, Minnesota, United States
|
|-
|Win
|align=center|20–9
|Sean Huffman
|Submission (punches)
|VFC: Fight Night at Harrahs 3
|
|align=center|1
|align=center|1:53
|Council Bluffs, Iowa, United States
|
|-
|Win
|align=center|19–9
|Mike Bruno
|TKO (flying knee and punches)
|Titan FC 34
|
|align=center|3
|align=center|0:51
|Kansas City, Missouri, United States
|
|-
| Loss
|align=center|18–9
|Jesse Steele McCall
|Submission (rear naked choke)
|VFC: Fight Night at Harrahs 2
|
|align=center|1
|align=center|4:57
|Council Bluffs, Iowa, United States
|
|-
| Loss
|align=center|18–8
|Ryan Couture
|Submission (rear naked choke)
|Bellator 135
|
|align=center|1
|align=center|3:23
|Thackerville, Oklahoma, United States
|
|-
|Win
|align=center|18–7
|Ted Worthington
|TKO (punches)
|Dynasty Combat Sports 12: Seasons Beatings 2014
|
|align=center|1
|align=center|0:43
|Lincoln, Nebraska, United States
|
|-
|Loss
|align=center|17–7
|Alexander Sarnavskiy
|Submission (rear naked choke)
|Bellator 128
|
|align=center|1
|align=center|2:32
|Thackerville, Oklahoma, United States
|
|-
| Loss
|align=center|17–6
|Christos Giagos
|KO (flying knee and punches)
|RFA 17: Cochrane vs. Giagos
|
|align=center|2
|align=center|2:04
|Sioux Falls, South Dakota, United States
|
|-
|Win
|align=center|17–5
|Anton Kuivanen
|KO (flying knee)
|Fight Night Finland: Cochrane vs. Kuivanen
|
|align=center|1
|align=center|0:48
|Helsinki, Finland
|
|-
|Win
|align=center|16–5
|Efrain Escudero
|Decision (unanimous)
|RFA 13: Cochrane vs. Escudero
|
|align=center|3
|align=center|5:00
|Lincoln, Nebraska, United States
|
|-
|Loss
|align=center|15–5
|Chris Heatherly
|Submission (armbar)
|Warriors for Heroes
|
|align=center|1
|align=center|4:13
|St. Louis, Missouri, United States
|
|-
|Win
|align=center|15–4
|Carey Vanier
|KO (elbow)
|Victory FC 40
|
|align=center|1
|align=center|4:23
|Ralston, Nebraska, United States
|
|-
|Loss
|align=center|14–4
|Marcus Edwards
|Submission (rear naked choke)
|Disorderly Conduct 19 – The Tribute
|
|align=center|1
|align=center|1:46
|Omaha, Nebraska, United States
|
|-
|Win
|align=center|14–3
|Deivison Francisco Ribeiro
|TKO (elbows)
|RFA 6: Krause vs. Imada 2
|
|align=center|3
|align=center|4:32
|Kansas City, Missouri, United States
|
|-
|Win
|align=center|13–3
|Derrick Burnsed
|Submission (armbar)
|RFA 4: Griffin vs. Escudero
|
|align=center|1
|align=center|4:38
|Las Vegas, Nevada, United States
|
|-
|Win
|align=center|12–3
|Joe Stevenson
|Submission (rear naked choke)
|RFA 3: Stevenson vs. Cochrane
|
|align=center|2
|align=center|1:04
|Kearney, Nebraska, United States
|
|-
|Loss
|align=center|11–3
|Cliff Wright
|Submission (rear naked choke)
|RFA 2: Yvel vs. Alexander
|
|align=center|1
|align=center|4:39
|Kearney, Nebraska, United States
|
|-
|Loss
|align=center|11–2 
|Ramico Blackmon
|Decision (unanimous)
|RFA 1: Pulver vs. Elliott
|
|align=center|3
|align=center|5:00
|Kearney, Nebraska, United States
|<small>165 lb catchweight
|-
|Win
|align=center|11–1
|Jamie Varner
|Decision (unanimous)
|Titan FC 20
|
|align=center|3
|align=center|5:00
|Kansas City, Kansas, United States
|<small>165 lb catchweight
|-
|Win
|align=center|10–1
|George Sheppard
|Decision (split)
|The Cage Inc. – Battle at the Border 10
|
|align=center|5
|align=center|5:00
|Hankinson, North Dakota, United States
|
|-
|Win
|align=center|9–1
|Rod Montoya
|Submission (rear naked choke)
|Extreme Challenge 181
|
|align=center|1
|align=center|1:20
|Council Bluffs, Iowa, United States
|
|-
|Win
|align=center|8–1 
|Marshall Martin
|KO (punch)
|The Cage Inc. – Battle at the Border 8
|
|align=center|2
|align=center|1:57
|Hankinson, North Dakota, United States
|
|-
| Win
|align=center|7–1 
|Marcus LeVesseur
|Submission (triangle choke)
|Seconds Out/Vivid MMA: Combat On Capital Hill 4
|
|align=center|1
|align=center|4:08
|St. Paul, Minnesota, United States
|
|-
|Win
|align=center|6–1
|Will Shutt
|Submission (arm-triangle choke)
|Extreme Challenge 162
|
|align=center|1
|align=center|1:36
|Council Bluffs, Iowa, United States
|
|-
|Win
|align=center|5–1 
|Jon Knutson
|Decision (unanimous)
|The Cage Inc. – Battle at the Border 6
|
|align=center|3
|align=center|5:00
|Hankinson, North Dakota, United States
|
|-
|Loss
|align=center|4–1 
|TJ O'Brien
|Submission (rear naked choke)
|Extreme Challenge – High Stakes
|
|align=center|1
|align=center|2:00
|Council Bluffs, Iowa, United States
| 
|-
|Win
|align=center|4–0
|Cory Simpson
|Submission (rear naked choke)
|The Cage Inc. – Battle at the Border 5
|
|align=center|2
|align=center|2:40
|Hankinson, North Dakota, United States
| 
|-
|Win
|align=center|3–0
|Carlos Cladio
|Submission (rear naked choke)
|The Cage Inc. – Proving Grounds 2
|
|align=center|1
|align=center|2:05
|Hankinson, North Dakota, United States
| 
|-
|Win
|align=center|2–0
|Jeremy Malaterre
|Decision (unanimous)
|Victory FC 30 – Night of Champions
|
|align=center|3
|align=center|5:00
|Council Bluffs, Iowa, United States
|
|-
|Win
|align=center|1–0
|Alex Harper
|Decision (unanimous)
|Victory FC 29 – The Rising
|
|align=center|3
|align=center|5:00
|Council Bluffs, Iowa, United States
|

|Loss
|align=center|0–1
| James Vick
|Decision (split)
|The Ultimate Fighter: Live
|
|align=center|1
|align=center|5:00
|Las Vegas, Nevada, United States
| 1-round TUF entry fight

Bareknuckle boxing record

|-
|Win
|align=center|4–2
|Eduardo Peralta	
|KO (punches)
|BKFC 33
|
|align=center|5
|align=center|0:35
|Omaha, Nebraska, United States
|
|-
|Loss
|align=center|3–2
|Josh Dyer	
|KO (punches)
|BKFC Fight Night: Omaha
|
|align=center|1
|align=center|1:39
|Omaha, Nebraska, United States
|
|-
|Loss
|align=center|3–1
|Mike Richman
|KO (punch)
|BKFC 21
|
|align=center|2
|align=center|0:37
|Omaha, Nebraska, United States
|
|-
|Win
|align=center|3–0
|Tyler Vogel
|TKO (doctor stoppage)
|BKFC 15
|
|align=center|5
|align=center|1:21
|Biloxi, Mississippi, United States
|
|-
|Win
|align=center|2–0
|Chris Leben
|Decision (unanimous)
|BKFC 6
|
|align=center|5
|align=center|2:00
|Tampa, Florida, United States
|
|-
|Win
|align=center|1–0
|Johny Hendricks
|TKO (punches)
|World Bare Knuckle Fighting Federation
|
|align=center|2
|align=center|0:21
|Casper, Wyoming, United States
|
|-

References

External links

 
 

1986 births
Living people
Lightweight mixed martial artists
Mixed martial artists utilizing boxing
American actors in gay pornographic films
Mixed martial artists from Nebraska
Pornographic film actors from Nebraska
American male mixed martial artists
People from Fairbury, Nebraska
American male boxers
Boxers from Nebraska
Bare-knuckle boxers